Montana: A Love Story  is the 14th album of pianist George Winston and tenth solo piano album, released on October 12, 2004.

Track listing

Charts

References

External links
 Liner notes

2005 albums
George Winston albums